Tyler Brown could refer to:
 Tyler Brown (footballer) (born 1999), Australian rules footballer 
 Tyler Brown (ice hockey) (born 1990), Canadian ice hockey player